Welcome to Flatch is an American mockumentary sitcom that premiered on Fox on March 17, 2022. It is based on the British series This Country, which was created and written by Daisy May Cooper and her brother Charlie Cooper who also played the lead roles. The US adaptation was developed by Jenny Bicks. In May 2022, the series was renewed for a second season which premiered on September 29, 2022.

Premise
A documentary crew sent to explore life in a small town meets the eccentric residents of Flatch, Ohio (a fictional rural community implied to be located just outside of Columbus in Franklin County).

Cast and characters

Main

 Holmes as Kelly Mallet
 Sam Straley as Lloyd "Shrub" Mallet
 Justin Linville as Mickey St. Jean
 Taylor Ortega as Nadine Garcia-Parney
 Krystal Smith as Mandy "Big Mandy" Matthews
 Aya Cash as Cheryl Peterson
 Seann William Scott as Joseph "Father Joe" Binghoffer
 Jaime Pressly as Barb Flatch (season 2)

Recurring
 William Tokarsky as Len
 Desmin Borges as Jimmy Jameson
 Jason MacDonald as Bobby Mallet
 Erin Bowles as Beth
 Karen Huie as June Jiang
 Sheila M. O'Rear as Leotha St. Jean
 Troy Hammond as Blind Billy
 Kyle Selig as Dylan Parney

Episodes

Series overview

Season 1 (2022)

Season 2 (2022–23)

Crossover
Holmes and Sam Straley guest starred as Kelly and Shrub Mallet on Call Me Kat in the episode "Call Me Flatch", which premiered on April 28, 2022.

Production

Development
On December 4, 2019, an American version of This Country was announced by Fox with Jenny Bicks and Paul Feig writing and directing the pilot respectively. On January 30, 2020, This Country was given a pilot order. On October 30, 2020, This Country had been given a series order and is scheduled for premiere in the 2021–22 television season. The series will be a co-production between Lionsgate Television, Fox Entertainment, Feigco Entertainment and BBC Studios with Jenny Bicks as writer and executive producer and Paul Feig as director and executive producer. On May 17, 2021, it was announced that the series title had been changed to Welcome to Flatch. On May 16, 2022, it was announced that the series was renewed for a second season.

Casting
On February 24, 2020, Seann William Scott was cast in a main role for the pilot. On March 4, 2020, Holmes, Sam Straley, Taylor Ortega and Krystal Smith were cast in main roles for the pilot. On July 10, 2020, Aya Cash and Justin Linville were cast in main roles for the pilot. On December 4, 2020, Desmin Borges was cast in a recurring role. On December 30, 2020, Jason MacDonald was cast in a recurring role. On August 4, 2022, Jaime Pressly joined cast as a series regular for the second season.

Filming
Production of the pilot began in March 2020, but production was shut down after a single day of filming due to the early days of the COVID-19 pandemic. Using the footage that had been filmed, a ten-minute presentation was created and was used to sell the series to Fox and secure a series order. In December 2020, it was reported that filming had commenced on the episode order. The town of Burgaw, North Carolina is the filming location for outside scenes of the fictional Flatch, Ohio.

Release
The series premiered on March 17, 2022. The second season premiered on September 29, 2022.

Reception

Critical response
The review aggregator website Rotten Tomatoes reported a 60% approval rating with an average rating of 6.5/10, based on 10 critic reviews. The website's critics consensus reads, "This Americanized reimagining of a British sitcom doesn't make the funniest of first impressions, but its small town scruff is endearing enough to merit sticking around and giving it a chance." Metacritic, which uses a weighted average, assigned a score of 58 out of 100 based on 9 critics, indicating "mixed or average reviews".

Ratings

Season 1

Season 2

Notes

References

External links
 
 

2020s American mockumentary television series
2020s American single-camera sitcoms 
2022 American television series debuts
American television series based on British television series
English-language television shows
Fox Broadcasting Company original programming
Television series by BBC Studios
Television series by Fox Entertainment
Television series by Lionsgate Television
Television shows filmed in North Carolina 
Television shows filmed in Wilmington, North Carolina
Television shows set in Ohio